Thomas "Tim" Daniel Cochran (April 7, 1955 – December 16, 2014) was a professor of Mathematics at Rice University specializing in topology, especially low-dimensional topology, the theory of knots and links and associated algebra.

Education and career

Tim Cochran was a valedictorian for the Severna Park High School Class of 1973. Later, he was an undergraduate at the Massachusetts Institute of Technology, and received his Ph.D. from the University of California, Berkeley in 1982 (Embedding 4-manifolds in S5). He then returned to MIT as a C.L.E. Moore Postdoctoral Instructor from 1982 to 1984. He was an NSF postdoctoral fellow from 1985 to 1987. Following brief appointments at Berkeley and Northwestern University, he started at Rice University as an associate professor in 1990. He became a full professor at Rice University in 1998. He died unexpectedly, aged 59, on December 16, 2014, while on a year-long sabbatical leave supported by a fellowship from the Simons Foundation.

Research contributions
With his coauthors Kent Orr and Peter Teichner, Cochran defined the solvable filtration of the knot concordance group, whose lower levels encapsulate many classical knot concordance invariants.

Cochran was also responsible for naming the slam-dunk move for surgery diagrams in low-dimensional topology.

Awards and honors
While at Rice, he was named an Outstanding Faculty Associate (1992–93), and received the Faculty Teaching and Mentoring Award from the Rice Graduate Student Association (2014)

He was named a fellow of the American Mathematical Society in 2014, for contributions to low-dimensional topology, specifically knot and link concordance, and for mentoring numerous junior mathematicians.

Selected publications
 Four-manifolds which embed in R6 but not in R5 and Seifert manifolds for fibered knots, Inventiones Mathematicae 77 (1984), 173–184
 Geometric invariants of link cobordism, Commentarii Mathematici Helvetici 60 (1985), 291–311.
 Derivatives of links: Massey products and Milnor's concordance invariants, Memoirs of the American Mathematical Society 84 (1990), no. 427.
 Not all links are concordant to boundary links (with Kent Orr), Annals of Mathematics 138 (1993), 519–554.
 Knot Concordance, Whitney Towers and L2-signatures (with Kent Orr and Peter Teichner), Annals of Mathematics 157 (2003), 433–519.
 Structure in the Classical Knot Concordance Group (with Kent Orr and Peter Teichner), Commentarii Mathematici Helvetici 79  (2004), no. 1, 105–123.
 Noncommutative Knot Theory, Algebraic and Geometric Topology 4 (2004), 347–398.
 Knot Concordance and von Neumann rho invariants (with Peter Teichner), Duke Math. Journal, 137 (2007), no.2, 337–379.
 Homology and Derived Series of Groups II: Dwyer's Theorem, (with Shelly Harvey), Geometry and Topology, 12(2008), 199–232.
 Knot concordance and Higher-order Blanchfield duality (with Shelly Harvey and Constance Leidy), Geometry and Topology, 13 (2009), 1419–1482. 
 Primary decomposition and the fractal nature of knot concordance (with Shelly Harvey and Constance Leidy), Math. Annalen, 351 (2011), no. 2, 443–508.
 Counterexamples to Kauffman's conjectures on slice knots (with Christopher Davis), Advances in Mathematics 274 (2015), 263–284.

References

External links
Tim Cochran's home page.

1955 births
2014 deaths
20th-century American mathematicians
21st-century American mathematicians
Topologists
Fellows of the American Mathematical Society
Massachusetts Institute of Technology alumni
Rice University faculty
UC Berkeley College of Letters and Science alumni